The Cajuru Linear Park, known simply as the Cajuru Park, is a park located in Curitiba, state of Paraná, Brazil.

References

External links
Parque Cajuru  (in Portuguese)

Parks in Curitiba